Dovre is the administrative centre of Dovre Municipality in Innlandet county, Norway. Both the European route E6 highway and Dovrebanen railway line both pass through the village. Dovre Church is located in the village.

Since 2012, the population and area data for this village area has not been separately tracked by Statistics Norway.

References

Dovre
Villages in Innlandet